Valentin Plamenov Galev (born 1 January 1984) is a Bulgarian professional footballer currently playing for Kostinbrod as a goalkeeper. He also serves as a goalkeepers coach for Vitosha Bistritsa.

Career
Valentin Galev earned his first professional contract with Lokomotiv Sofia, signing from their academy in 2002. On 17 May 2003, Galev made his debut in Bulgarian A PFG when he replaced Daniel Peev in the 8th minute of the match against Litex Lovech following the sending-off of Vladimir Manolkov.

On 29 June 2015 Galev joined Botev Plovdiv. On 18 April 2016 his contract was terminated by mutual agreement. During his short spell at Botev Plovdiv Galev was injured most of the time and played in just a single game, the 1-1 draw with Lokomotiv Plovdiv.

On 25 May 2021 he was announced as the goalkeeper coach of Vitosha Bistritsa, who will also play for the team in Third League.

Career statistics

References

External links
 

Living people
1984 births
Bulgarian footballers
First Professional Football League (Bulgaria) players
FC Lokomotiv 1929 Sofia players
Botev Plovdiv players
FC Septemvri Sofia players
FC Vitosha Bistritsa players
Association football goalkeepers